Abid Briki (born 20 June 1957; Arabic: عبيد البريكي) is a Tunisian trade unionist and politician. He served as Minister of Civil Service, Governance and the Fight against Corruption in the Chahed Cabinet.

Early life 
Briki was born in Zarzis.

Political career 
Briki founded the Tunisia Forward party in 2018. He was a candidate in the 2019 presidential election and came in 17th place. Briki announced he would not stand as a candidate in the 2022 parliamentary election.

References 

1957 births
Living people
21st-century Tunisian politicians
Government ministers of Tunisia
Tunisian political party founders
Tunisian trade unionists

People from Zarzis
Candidates for President of Tunisia